is a railway station in the city of  Inazawa, Aichi Prefecture, Japan, operated by Central Japan Railway Company (JR Tōkai).

Lines
Inazawa Station is served by the Tōkaidō Main Line, and is located 377.1 kilometers from the starting point of the line at Tokyo Station.

Station layout
The station has an island platform connected to the station building by a footbridge. The station building has automated ticket machines, TOICA automated turnstiles and a staffed ticket office.

Platforms

Adjacent stations

|-
!colspan=5|Central Japan Railway Company

Station history
Inazawa Station was opened on August 5, 1904 as a station on the Japanese Government Railway (JGR) Tōkaidō Line. The JGR became the JNR after World War II. The station building was rebuilt in March 1953. Along with the division and privatization of JNR on April 1, 1987, the station came under the control and operation of the Central Japan Railway Company. A new station building was completed in April 2000.

Station numbering was introduced to the section of the Tōkaidō Line operated JR Central in March 2018; Inazawa Station was assigned station number CA71.

Passenger statistics
In fiscal 2017, the station was used by an average of 9130 passengers daily.

Surrounding area
Inazawa Station is located approximately two kilometers east of the city center of Inazawa.

See also
 List of Railway Stations in Japan

References

Yoshikawa, Fumio. Tokaido-sen 130-nen no ayumi. Grand-Prix Publishing (2002) .

External links

official home page

Railway stations in Japan opened in 1904
Railway stations in Aichi Prefecture
Tōkaidō Main Line
Stations of Central Japan Railway Company
Inazawa